Amphilectus utriculus is a species of demosponges found in the Atlantic waters west of Mauritania, western Africa. The species name utriculus is Latin for "small water bag", referring to the hollow, flattened shape.

The species was discovered in 1988 in the waters southwest of Cap Timiris in Mauritania, at about 270 m depth, on muddy bottom. It has been observed in several other locations near Cap Timiris.

References

Poecilosclerida
Fauna of the Atlantic Ocean
Fauna of Mauritania
Animals described in 2012